The Anna Day House is an historic house in Cambridge, Massachusetts.

Description 
The -story wood-frame cottage was built in 1856, and is a well-preserved example of Gothic Revival styling. This instance in particular is notable for its drip-style bargeboard decoration. The house was built as part of the initial subdivision of the Strawberry Hill area. Other Gothic features, including finials on the gable and drip molding surrounding the windows, have been lost.

The house was listed on the National Register of Historic Places on April 13, 1982.

See also
National Register of Historic Places listings in Cambridge, Massachusetts

References

Houses completed in 1856
Houses on the National Register of Historic Places in Cambridge, Massachusetts
Gothic Revival architecture in Massachusetts